Wanda Maria Howell is an American actress and singer.

Career

Howell was born in Gastonia, North Carolina and graduated Winston-Salem State University in Winston-Salem, North Carolina. She worked as jazz singer and made her film debut in The Color Purple (1985). She lived in Okinawa, Japan, from 1995-2001.

She made guest appearances on Drop Dead Diva, Army Wives, The Game, Necessary Roughness, and The Vampire Diaries, and well co-starred in films include Daddy's Little Girls (2007), Mississippi Damned (2009), The Blind Side (2009), and What to Expect When You're Expecting (2012).

In 2013, Howell played Seeder in The Hunger Games: Catching Fire. Also in 2012, she was cast in recurring role of NBC post-apocalyptic series Revolution as Grace Beaumont, and in 2013 played Ida Hayes in Lifetime comedy-drama Devious Maids.

Filmography

Film

Television

Video games

References

External links
 
 

Living people
American film actresses
American television actresses
American stage actresses
Actresses from North Carolina
20th-century American actresses
21st-century American actresses
Winston-Salem State University alumni
African-American actresses
People from Gastonia, North Carolina
Year of birth missing (living people)
20th-century African-American women
20th-century African-American people
21st-century African-American women
21st-century African-American people